The Ambassador Extraordinary and Plenipotentiary of the Russian Federation to the Republic of Turkey is the official representative of the President and the Government of the Russian Federation to the President and the Government of Turkey.

The ambassador and his staff work at large in the Embassy of Russia in Ankara. There are consulates general in Istanbul, Trabzon and Antalya, and an honorary consul based in Izmir.

The post of Russian Ambassador to Turkey is currently held by Alexei Yerkhov, incumbent since 19 June 2017.

History of diplomatic relations

Diplomatic relations between the antecedent states of Russia and Turkey date back to the fifteenth century. An early Russian embassy was sent to Constantinople in the mid-1490s, during the reign of Ivan III of Russia. Representatives continued to be exchanged intermittently during the period of the Tsardom of Russia, and after the declaration of the Russian Empire in 1721. Relations were periodically suspended during periods of conflict, and finally came to a close in 1914 with the Ottoman entry into the First World War on the side of the Triple Alliance. During the war, the Russian Revolution toppled the tsar and brought an end to the empire. Relations were resumed and gradually strengthened between the Ottomans and the Russian Soviet Federative Socialist Republic from 1919 onwards, and survived the abolition of the Ottoman sultanate in 1922 and the creation of the Republic of Turkey the following year. Meanwhile the Soviet Union had been established that same year. Letters were exchanged between Mustafa Kemal Atatürk and People's Commissar for Foreign Affairs Georgy Chicherin, with the official date for the establishment of diplomatic relations being 3 June 1920, the date of Chicherin's letter. The two states remained in diplomatic contact for the remainder of the existence of the Soviet Union. 

With the dissolution of the Soviet Union in 1991, Turkey recognised the Russian Federation as the successor state of the USSR, and the incumbent Soviet ambassador, continued as the Russian ambassador to Turkey until 1994. Diplomatic relations fluctuated during the late twentieth and early twenty-first centuries, with tensions rising during the Russian military intervention in the Syrian Civil War, during which Turkey shot down a Russian jetfighter in 2015. Relations were normalised in the aftermath, though in 2016 the Russian ambassador to Turkey, Andrei Karlov, was assassinated by an off-duty Turkish policeman. He became the fourth Russian ambassador to be killed while in post, and the first since the Soviet ambassador to Poland Pyotr Voykov was assassinated in Warsaw in 1927.

List of representatives (1702 – present)

Representatives of the Tsardom of Russia to the Ottoman Empire (1702 – 1721)

Representatives of the Russian Empire to the Ottoman Empire (1721 – 1917)

Representatives of the Russian Soviet Federative Socialist Republic to the Ottoman Empire (1919 – 1923)

Representatives of the Union of Soviet Socialist Republics to the Republic of Turkey (1923 – 1991)

Representatives of the Russian Federation to the Republic of Turkey (1991 – present)

References

 
 
Turkey
Russia